10th Missouri Infantry Regiment may refer to:
10th Missouri Infantry Regiment (Confederate)
10th Missouri Infantry Regiment (Union)